Aldo Rafael Forte (b. Havana, Cuba, 1953) is an American composer of Cuban descent .

References

1953 births
American male composers
21st-century American composers
Living people
21st-century American male musicians